The history of firearms begins in 10th-century China, when bamboo tubes containing gunpowder and pellet projectiles were mounted on spears to make portable fire lances, operable by one person. This was later used effectively as a shock weapon in the Siege of De'an in 1132. In the 13th century, fire lance barrels were replaced with metal tubes and transformed into metal-barreled hand cannons. The technology gradually spread throughout Eurasia during the 14th century and evolved into flintlocks, blunderbusses, and other variants. The 19th and 20th centuries saw an acceleration in this evolution, with the introduction of the magazine, belt-fed weapons, metal cartridges, and the automatic firearm. Older firearms typically used black powder as a propellant, but modern firearms use smokeless powder or other propellants. Most modern firearms have rifled barrels.

China

The fire lance was a black-powder–filled tube attached to the end of a spear and used as a flamethrower (different from older Greek fire-powered Byzantine flamethrower). Shrapnel was sometimes placed in the barrel so that it would fly out together with the flames. The earliest known depiction of a gunpowder weapon is the illustration of a fire-lance on a mid-10th century silk banner from Dunhuang. The De'an Shoucheng Lu, an account of the siege of De'an in 1132 during the Jin–Song Wars, records that Song forces used fire-lances against the Jurchen.

The proportion of saltpeter in the propellant was increased to maximize its power. To better withstand that power, paper and bamboo fire-lance barrels were replaced with metal. To leverage that power, shrapnel was replaced by projectiles whose size and shape filled the barrel more completely. With this, the basic features of the gun emerged: a metal barrel, high-nitrate gunpowder, and a properly sized projectile.

The earliest depiction of a gun is a sculpture from a cave in Sichuan dating to the 12th century. It depicts a Chinese figure carrying a vase-shaped bombard with flames and a cannonball emerging from it. The oldest surviving firearm is the Heilongjiang hand cannon dated to 1288, which was discovered in modern-day Acheng District where the History of Yuan records that battles were fought. Li Ting, a military commander of Jurchen descent, led foot soldiers armed with hand cannons to suppress the rebellion of the Christian Mongol Prince Nayan.

Middle East

Firearms appeared in the Middle East between the late 13th and early 14th century. Ahmad Y. al-Hassan claimed that the Battle of Ain Jalut in 1260 pitted the Mamluks against the Mongols. "The first cannon in history" used gunpowder almost identical with the ideal composition for explosive gunpowder. However, Iqtidar Alam Khan argued that it was invading Mongols who introduced gunpowder to the Islamic world and cites Mamluk antagonism towards early riflemen as an example of how gunpowder weapons were not always accepted.

The first references what may have been arquebuses by the Janissary corps of the Ottoman army date them from 1394 to 1465. However, it is unclear whether these were arquebuses or small cannons as late as 1444, but the fact that they were listed separately from cannons in mid-15th century inventories suggests that they were handheld firearms.

The musket first appeared in the Ottoman Empire by 1465. In the Shen Qi Pu (神器譜), a firearms manual written in 1598, Chinese firearm designer and writer Zhao Shi Zhen described Turkish muskets as superior to European muskets. At some point before 1598, Turks developed a pivoting matchlock mechanism that was later modified by Zhao into the first mechanism using a rack-and-pinion.

One of the major hurdles that prevented matchlock guns from large-scale adoption was complaints that strong wind and rain could either blow away or ruin priming powder placed in the flash pan. Also mentioned in Shen Qi Pu, Zhao later developed the Xuanyuan arquebus (軒轅銃), which used a novel rack-and-pinion mechanism. This firing mechanism was connected to both the serpentine and flash pan cover and designed so that whenever the trigger is pulled, the serpentine was lowered at the same time as flash pan cover opened, minimizing the priming powder's exposure to open air and thus reducing the risk of priming powder being blown away by strong wind or spoiled by rain. The combination of a trigger-operated flash pan cover and small copper rain cover mounted on a pendulum was considered a more sophisticated approach to the Japanese solution of covering the entire firing mechanism with a lacquered box, which could hamper aiming, shooting and reloading. The Chinese military book Wu Pei Chih (1621) describes Turkish muskets that used similar rack and pinion mechanisms, which were not known to have been used in European firearms at the time.

Southeast Asia 

Even though the knowledge of making gunpowder-based weapons in Nusantara archipelago was recorded after the failed Mongol invasion of Java (1293), and the predecessor of firearms, the pole gun (bedil tombak), was recorded in Java in 1413, the knowledge of making "true" firearms came much later, after the middle of the 15th century. It was most probably brought by Arabs, no earlier than 1460. Before the arrival of the Portuguese in Southeast Asia, primitive firearms in the form of the Java arquebus was already present.

The technology further improved after the Portuguese capture of Malacca (1511). Starting in 1513, the traditions of German-Bohemian and Turkish gun-making traditions merged. This resulted in the Indo-Portuguese tradition of making matchlocks. Indian craftsmen modified the design by introducing a short, almost pistol-like buttstock held against the cheek, not the shoulder, when aiming. They reduced the caliber and made the gun lighter and more balanced. The Portuguese, who conducted much fighting aboard ships and river craft, valued a more compact gun, and thus this approach became popular. Malay gun founders, regarded as at the same level with those of Germany, quickly adapted these new firearms, and birthed a new type of arquebus, the istinggar.

South Asia 

The first recorded use of firearms in South Asia was at the Battle of Adoni in 1368. In the Deccans, the Bahmani sultanate led by Mohammed Shah I used a train of artillery against the Vijayanagara Empire under Harihara II. Their use by Sultan Mohammed Shah of Gujarat in the fifteenth century was recorded. When the Portuguese reached India in 1498, they brought with them firearms, among them the matchlock musket and man-of-war (ships) armed with cannons. Portuguese travelers observed that firearms there were already in use. Peasants of the Gangetic plains used cheap handguns made by local blacksmiths. Travancore, Kashmir, Rajasthan, Punjab and Sindh hosted sites of arms manufacture. In the early 16th century, Zamorin of Calicut, had begun to emulate the Portuguese and began to arm his ships with naval gun pieces, combining local and imported technology.

In the 16th century, Central Asian prince Babur, the first Mughal emperor, brought Turkish firearms, which Mughal adversaries used against the Delhi Sultanate in the First Battle of Panipat, which the Rajputs and the Afghans, in turn adopted. Across the 16th and 17th century, firearms played an important role in the Mughal military. Known as the tufang, Mughal emperor Akbar introduced many improvements in the matchlock. However until the 18th century, firearms, because of their longer loading time, were inferior to longbows. Only in the middle of the 18th century, following the French and the English, efforts were made to improve the arms and discipline of the foot soldier.

Firearms were also developed by the Marathas, although weaker than their counterparts such as the Mughals and Mysore. Balaji Baji Rao organised the arm in professional lines and Madhavji Sindhia established a more efficient gun foundry under the supervision of European gun makers. During the 18th century, Tipu Sultan was notable for effective use of guns, mortar, rockets and howitzers; the Nizam of Hyderabad manufactured guns with the help of French officers, while Sikhs under Maharaja Ranjit Singh pioneered the development of horse-artillery on the same lines as that of the East India Company.

Europe

One theory of how gunpowder came to Europe is via the Silk Road; another holds that it arrived during the Mongol invasion in the first half of the 13th century. English Privy Wardrobe accounts list ribaldis, a type of cannon, in the 1340s, and siege guns were used by the English at the Siege of Calais (1346–47).

The first mention of firearms in Russia is found in the  chronicle, which stated that during the 1382 defense of Moscow from Tokhtamysh's Golden Horde, Muscovites used firearms called , which were of Eastern origin; this word derives from Turkic  "gun".

The earliest surviving firearm in Europe was found in Otepää, Estonia. It dates to at least 1396.

Firearms evolved during the 1419-1434 Hussite Wars. The Hussite army consisted mostly of civilian militia, both men and women, who lacked the skill, experience and often weapons and armor comparable to that of the professional Crusader invaders that they faced. Gradually, Hussites pioneered battlefield use of firearms together with war wagons. Firearms were employed in auxiliary roles in 1419–1421. The first use of firearms as primary offensive weapons came in the 1421 Battle of Kutná Hora. From this moment on, firearms formed the core of Hussite tactics as well as a staple of Czech civilian possession. The first English source about handheld firearms discussed hand cannons in 1473.
In the late 15th century, the Ottoman Empire used firearms as part of its regular infantry. The earliest type of Turkish hand cannons are called Şakaloz, after the Hungarian hand cannon Szakállas puska in the 15th century.

Early modern age

During the early modern age, hand-held cannons evolved into the matchlock, wheellock, doglock, and flintlock rifle, respectively, followed by the breech loader and finally the automatic weapon. As ignition devices, matchlocks, wheellocks, snaplock, flintlocks and percussion caps were used in turn. The paper cartridge was introduced sometime before 1586, and the bayonet came to use in 16th century France. Hand grenades, thrown by grenadiers, appeared around the same time.

Early cartridge firearms had to be cocked and caught by the "sear", which holds the hammer back, before each shot. Pulling the trigger allows the hammer or striker to fly forward, striking the "firing pin," which then strikes the "primer," igniting an impact-sensitive chemical compound (historically, first fulminate of mercury, then potassium chlorate, now lead styphnate) which shoots a flame through the "flash hole" into the cartridge's propellant chamber, igniting the propellant.

The Springfield Armory in Springfield, Massachusetts became important during the 1850s, when it debuted the Springfield rifle. Springfield rifles were among the first breech-loading rifles, starting production in 1865. By that time, metallurgy had developed sufficiently so that brass could be made into ammunition cases. Previously, each round was custom-made as needed: the shooter poured loose powder down the barrel, used leather or cloth for wadding if time allowed, selected a suitable projectile (lead ball, rocks, arrow, or nails), then seated the projectile on top of the powder charge by means of a ramrod. Performance was erratic. Fixed ammunition combined a primer, the pre-measured charge, and the projectile in a water-resistant brass cartridge case. Most importantly, the soft brass expanded under pressure of the gas to seal the rear end of the barrel, which prevented the shooter from being maimed by escaping high-pressure gas when they pulled the trigger.

Repeating and automatic firearms
A repeating firearm, ("repeater") can hold multiple cartridges and be fired multiple times before reloading. Repeaters employ a variety of mechanisms for readying a bullet for firing. This typically involves ejecting a used cartridge and moving a new one into the firing chamber. Mechanisms include bolt-action, lever-action, slide-action, semi-automatic, and fully-automatic firearms. Automatic weapons cycle a new round into the firing chamber without the help of the shooter. Semi-automatics fire one round per trigger pull. Full automatics fire multiple rounds per pull.

Revolvers 
Revolvers hold cartridges in a rotating cylinder, which serves as both a magazine and firing chamber. They were the earliest repeaters. Revolving rifles were sometimes called "turret guns". Single action revolvers were fired after manually cocking the hammer for each shot. This design dates from at least 1836, with the introduction of the Colt Paterson. Double-action revolvers emerged around the same time. They can be fired after cocking the trigger, but also by pulling the trigger without first cocking it.Double-action only or DAO revolvers can be fired only using the trigger.

The Springfield Model 1892–99 was used during the Spanish–American War.

Self-loaders 
The first successful self-loader was the Gatling gun, a hand-cranked revolver. It was invented by Richard Jordan Gatling and fielded by the Union forces during the American Civil War. Self-loaders use energy to reload. The first successful self-loading rifle was the Mondragón rifle. The world's first machine gun was the Maxim gun, developed by British inventor Sir Hiram Maxim in 1884.

The world's first successful self-loading rifle was the Mondragón rifle, designed in 1908 by Mexican general Manuel Mondragón. It was the first self-loading firearm able to be operated by one person. It was used during the Mexican Revolution (Mexican Army) and World War I (Imperial German Flying Corps).

The first submachine gun, which fires pistol cartridges and can be used by one soldier, was the MP18.1, invented by Theodor Bergmann. It was introduced in 1918 by the German Army as the primary weapon of the Stosstruppen (assault groups specialized in trench combat). During World War II well-crafted versions such as the Thompson were replaced by mass-produced alternatives, such as the M3.

The first successful assault rifle was the StG 44, introduced during World War II by the Germans. It was the first firearm to occupy the gap between rifles and submachine guns. The assault rifle was more powerful and had longer range than the submachine gun, but was less powerful and shorter range than standard rifles. It used intermediate size rounds as well and offered select-fire option (switch from full automatic to semi-automatic). The AK-47, commonly known as the "Kalashnikov", is the most manufactured assault rifle.

The battle rifle was a select-fire rifle that retained the long range of the M1 Garand. NATO members adopted battle rifles of their own. In practice, the powerful cartridge of the battle rifle proved to be difficult to control during fully automatic fire.

See also
Science and technology of the Song dynasty
Jiao Yu
Huolongjing
History of cannon
History of weapons
Military history
Table of handgun and rifle cartridges
Gunpowder artillery in the Song dynasty

References

Bibliography 

 
 
 
 
 
 .
 Sun Laichen (2006) Chinese Gunpowder Technology Technology and Dai Viet, ca. 1390 -1497. In Vietnam Borderless Histories Eds Nhung Tuyet Tran & Anthony Reid University of Wisconsin Press

Further reading
 Chase, Kenneth. Firearms: A Global History to 1700 (2008) excerpt
 DK. Firearms: An Illustrated History (2014) excerpt

 Silverman, David J. Thundersticks: Firearms and the Violent Transformation of Native America (2016) excerpt
 Wills, Chuck and Robert Lindley. The Illustrated History of Guns: From First Firearms to Semiautomatic Weapons (2014) excerpt

External links

Ammunition
Firearms
Weapon history